Troy University at Montgomery is a satellite campus of Troy University and is located in Montgomery, Alabama. It is part of the Troy University System.  The campus is located in the western part of downtown, and includes the Rosa Parks Museum and Library, the Davis Theatre for the Performing Arts, and portions of the historic Bell Building. But also has other campuses around the state of Alabama. The university also operates the W.A. Gayle Planetarium in Oak Park.

History
The campus has its roots in extension courses offered at Maxwell Air Force Base in Montgomery during the 1950s. A separate Troy State College teaching center was established at Maxwell in 1965, which led to the creation of the present-day Montgomery Campus. 

In 1982, the Montgomery and Dothan campuses were granted independent accreditation, and the Troy State University System was formed. In April 2004, "State" was dropped from the University's name to reflect the institution's new, broader focus. In August 2005, all Troy campuses were reunified under one accreditation.

Academics

For several years in a row, the Princeton Review named the university to its "Best in the Southeast" list due to excellence in academic programs and institutional data collected from the university.

In 2017, the U.S. News & World Report ranked the university as the #14 Most Innovative School, as well as the #27-ranked Top Public School among South regional universities.

Structure
Troy University at Montgomery offers 3 associate degree programs, 15 bachelor's degree programs, 10 master's degree programs, and one doctoral program. The school also offers 2 education specialist programs.  In addition to the nontraditional programs and courses offered on the Montgomery Campus, students are also given access to all the degree programs and courses offered at other Troy University campuses.

All degree programs can also work in conjunction with Troy University's other campuses, allowing students to take additional classes at different Troy campuses at the same time if necessary.

Classes
The majority of the classes offered on the Montgomery campus are evening classes.  All of the degrees offered by the campus can be completed entirely through evening classes.  There are also classes offered online through in conjunction with military students at Maxwell Air Force Base.  Additional weekend, television, and online courses are also available.

Schools/Colleges
The university is composed of five academic colleges, a graduate school, and a division of general studies:

 College of Arts & Sciences
 College of Education
 College of Communications & Fine Arts
 Sorrell College of Business
 College of Heath & Human Services
 The Graduate School
 Division of General Studies

Military and Veterans
Since 1950, Troy University has worked with military service members, veterans and their families as they pursue advanced education under the G.I. Bill, the Tuition Assistance Program, the MyCAA initiative, private funding and other financing options. Troy University is an educational partner with the U.S. Army, Navy, Air Force, Marine Corps and Coast Guard, providing military-specific scholarships and TROY for Troops support centers to military-affiliated students and veterans. The University proudly counts some 60 flag officers among the ranks of its alumni, has a presence on or near over 30 military installations worldwide and participates in online learning programs with all service branches. For generations, Troy University has understood the needs of the military student and has built a military inclusive institution offering a broad range of high quality, very affordable undergraduate and graduate academic programs supported by outstanding student services.

Troy currently offers an educational support site for military personnel at nearby Maxwell Air Force Base.

Student life

Student organizations
 Student Government Association (SGA)
 Alpha Sigma Lambda (NHS)
 Gamma Beta Phi (NHS)
 Chi Sigma Iota
 English Club
 A World Around You (AWAY) International Student Organization
 Psychology Club
 Social Justice Club

Campus

The following are some of the features on the Troy University-Montgomery campus:

 Historic Davis Theater (formerly the Paramount Theater)
 Rosa Parks Museum
 Bell Building
 Gayle Planetarium
 Bell Tower
 Barnes & Noble College Bookstore
 Starbucks
 Building 136
 Whitley Hall
 Bartlett Hall

Troy University-Montgomery has a well-facilitated campus with extensive support services for students.  The campus is located in downtown Montgomery, where it houses the historic Davis Theater for the Performing Arts, the Rosa Parks Museum and Library, and the W. A. Gayle Planetarium.  The campus also consists of Whitley Hall, portions of the historic Bell Building, the Bartlett building, building 136, and the School of Nursing building.  The Gene Elrod Success Center provides a congenial learning environment where students are given academic tutoring and counseling. Career guidance and study skill workshops are among the other services offered by this center. The university library offers abundant resources and reference materials for students, both online and offline.

References

External links

 Troy University Montgomery campus

Montgomery
Universities and colleges in Montgomery, Alabama
Educational institutions established in 1965
1965 establishments in Alabama
Satellite campuses